Dodoma Airport  is an airport serving the Tanzanian capital of Dodoma located inside Dodoma Region, It has a runway of about 2.5 km at an elevation of .

Airlines and destinations

See also
 Msalato International Airport

References

External links
Dodoma Airport approach on YouTube

Airports in Tanzania
Buildings and structures in the Dodoma Region